Beaver Woman may refer to:
Beaver Woman Lake, a lake in Montana
Dorothy Burney Richards, American conservationist and founder of Beaversprite

See also 
 Beaver (surname)